Alexandra Park may refer to:

Places

England 
 Alexandra Park, Hastings
 Alexandra Park, Ipswich
 Alexandra Park, London
 Alexandra Park, Manchester

 Alexandra Park, Oldham
 Alexandra Park, Portsmouth
 Alexandra Park, Poole
 Alexandra Park Racecourse, London

Other places 
 Alexandra Park, Toronto, Canada
 Alexandra Park, in the West End of Vancouver, Canada
 Alexandra Park, Auckland, New Zealand
 Alexandra Park, Wellington, next to Government House, New Zealand
 Alexandra Park, Belfast, Northern Ireland
 Alexandra Park, Glasgow, Scotland
 Alexandra Park cricket ground, Pietermaritzburg, also known as the City Oval, South Africa
 Alexandra Park, Harare, Zimbabwe

People 
 Alexandra Park (actress) (born 1989), Australian actress
 Alexandra Parks (born 1984), English singer-songwriter

See also 
 
 Alexander Park (disambiguation)
 Alexandra Gardens (disambiguation)
 Alexandra Stadium, home ground of Crewe Alexandra F.C.